Unnamalaikadai is a panchayat town in Kanya Kumari district in the Indian state of Tamil Nadu.

This panchayat town is located at a distance of 1 km from Marthandam on the way to Kulasekaram.

Demographics
Unnamalaikadai is a Town Panchayat city in district of Kanniyakumari, Tamil Nadu. The Unnamalaikadai city is divided into 18 wards for which elections are held every 5 years. The Unnamalaikadai Town Panchayat has population of 23,656 of which 11,795 are males while 11,861 are females as per report released by Census India 2011.

Population of Children with age of 0-6 is 2347 which is 9.92% of total population of Unnamalaikadai (TP). In Unnamalaikadai Town Panchayat, Female Sex Ratio is of 1006 against state average of 996. Moreover, Child Sex Ratio in Unnamalaikadai is around 922 compared to Tamil Nadu state average of 943. Literacy rate of Unnamalaikadai city is 92.25% higher than state average of 80.09%. In Unnamalaikadai, Male literacy is around 94.96% while female literacy rate is 89.59%.

Unnamalaikadai Town Panchayat has total administration over 5,969 houses to which it supplies basic amenities like water and sewerage. It is also authorize to build roads within Town Panchayat limits and impose taxes on properties coming under its jurisdiction.

Residential Area

Nesaraj Nagar is a residential area located in between Marthandam & Unnamalaikadai which is under Unnamalaikadai Panchayat. The landmark of this area is opposite to Child Jesus Matriculation Higher Secondary School. A new residential area has emerged behind Nesaraj Nagar. Rotary Club of Marthandam and Indian Medical Association are nearby landmarks.

Churches

There is a famous Roman Catholic Church located in Unnamalaikadai Junction.

Schools

1. Child Jesus Matriculation Higher Secondary School

2. Government Primary School

Hospitals

1. Primary Health Centre, Unnamalaikadai Junction

2. Homeopathy Clinic, Near Govt. Primary School

3. Siddha Clinic, Nesaraj Nagar

4. Govind Ayurveda Health Care, Unnamalaikadai

Market

There is a small fish market near Unnamalaikadai Junction.

Post Office and Banks

Unnamalaikadai Post Office - Pincode - 629179

1. Unnamalaikadai Primary Agricultural Co-operative Credit Society

2. Canara Bank

References

Cities and towns in Kanyakumari district